KARB (98.3 FM) is a radio station broadcasting a country music format. Licensed to Price, Utah, United States, the station is owned by Eastern Utah Broadcasting Company.

References

External links

ARB